Adrian Carter (born 1959) is an English architect, Associate professor at the Department of Architecture and Design  at Aalborg University , Denmark and Director of the Utzon Research Center in Aalborg. Carter also teaches at the Aarhus School of Architecture, Århus, Denmark. Under the auspices of Aalborg University, Adrian Carter initiated and established the Utzon Center and became its first Director. The Utzon Center building on the Aalborg harbourfront was designed by Jørn Utzon in conjunction with his architect son Kim Utzon¹s office and opened to the public in May 2008.

Education and career 
Adrian Carter studied architecture at Portsmouth Polytechnic, England, from 1978 to 1985. He then moved to Finland to work as a student trainee with architects Reima and Raili Pietilä in Helsinki. Carter then continued his studies at The Royal Danish Academy of Fine Arts School of Architecture , Copenhagen, where he qualified as an architect, and later receiving an MPhil at the University of Cambridge, England.

Carter then went to work as an assistant for architects Anchor, Mortlock and Woolley in Sydney, Australia. After this he moved to Norway to work as an assistant for architect Niels Torp in Oslo, during the design of the Aker Brygge harbour development in Oslo. After that he worked as an assistant for architect Henning Larsen. Following that he worked for architects Dissing+Weitling in Copenhagen, during the design of the Storebælt Suspension Bridge.

Adrian Carter has taught at the Aarhus School of Architecture since 2000 and has been Associate professor at Aalborg University since 2005. Carter is also an Honorary Associate Professor at the Faculty of Architecture, University of Sydney and has acted as an advisor to the Australian Government Department of the Environment and Heritage in their nomination of the Sydney Opera House for inscription on the World Heritage List. Professor Adrian Carter was announced as Head of Discipline, Abedian School of Architecture, Bond University, Gold Coast,  Australia in April 2014 and took up leadership of the School from 1 January 2015. He was stood down from his role as Head of School on 9 November 2018.

References

External links
Dissing+Weitling

Danish architects
20th-century English architects
English expatriates in Denmark
Alumni of the University of Portsmouth
1959 births
Living people
Royal Danish Academy of Fine Arts alumni
Academic staff of Aalborg University
Place of birth missing (living people)